Mikaylia Roanna Haldane (born 25 February 1995) is a Jamaican badminton player. Haldane was the mixed doubles champion at the 2009 National Championships with her partner Daniel Thompson. She was selected to compete at the 2011 Pan American Games in Guadalajara, Mexico. Partnered with Garron Palmer, she emerged as the mixed doubles champion at the 2014 Carebaco International tournament. Haldane also participated at the 2014 and 2018 Central American and Caribbean Games.

Achievements

BWF International Challenge/Series 
Women's doubles

Mixed doubles

  BWF International Challenge tournament
  BWF International Series tournament
  BWF Future Series tournament

References

External links 
 

1995 births
Living people
Jamaican female badminton players
Pan American Games competitors for Jamaica
Badminton players at the 2011 Pan American Games
Competitors at the 2014 Central American and Caribbean Games
Competitors at the 2018 Central American and Caribbean Games
20th-century Jamaican women
21st-century Jamaican women